Bogomolov (masculine) or Bogomolova (feminine) is a Russian surname. 

Notable people with the surname include:

Alex Bogomolov Jr., Russian professional tennis player
Fedor Bogomolov (born 1946), Russian and American mathematician
Galina Bogomolova (born 1977), Russian long-distance runner
Lyudmila Bogomolova (born 1932), Russian ballet dancer
Nikolai Bogomolov (born 1991), Russian professional ice hockey defenceman
Oleg Bogomolov, governor of Kurgan Oblast
Sergei Bogomolov, retired Russian professional footballer
Vladimir Bogomolov (writer) (1926–2003), Soviet writer
Vladimir Bogomolov (bodyguard) (c.1945–2009), Soviet security officer and a bodyguard of Leonid Brezhnev

See also
Bogomolov conjecture
Bogomolov-Miyaoka-Yau inequality

Russian-language surnames